Adis Ahmetovic  (born 27 July 1993) is a German politician of Bosnian descent. He is a member of the Social Democratic Party of Germany and a Member of the Bundestag.

Biography 
Ahmetovic's parents are from Bosnia and Herzegovina. During the Yugoslav Wars, they fled to Hannover in 1992, where Adis Ahmetovic was born in 1993. His father Fuad, who had previously worked as an administrative lawyer in Kotor Varoš, became a construction worker in Germany and later a warehouse clerk, his mother Edina worked as a cleaner. At the age of 22, Ahmetovic became a German citizen and gave up his Bosnian passport. In addition to German, he also speaks the Bosnian language.

In 2011, Ahmetovic graduated from Herschel School in Hannover and obtained his Abitur. At Leibniz University Hannover, he studied teaching politics, economics and German studies. During his studies he received a scholarship from the Friedrich Ebert Foundation. In 2019 he completed his studies obtaining the degree Master of Education.

During his studies in 2013, Ahmetovic worked as a research assistant for Kerstin Tack, a member of the Bundestag. In 2015, Ahmetovic became head of Mustafa Erkan's office, a former SPD member and member of the Lower Saxon Landtag, previously Ahmetovic worked there as a research assistant in the office. From 2016 to 2020 he worked as an office manager and later as a personal advisor to Minister President of Lower Saxony and Chairman of the Lower Saxon SPD, Stephan Weil. Since 2020 he has been working as a consultant for government planning and fundamental issues in the Lower Saxon State Chancellery.

Ahmetovic is unmarried, does not practice any religion and lives in Hannover-Bothfeld.

Political career

Early beginnings
Ahmetovic joined the Social Democratic Party of Germany in 2008. He was chairman of the Young Socialists in the SPD in the Hannover Region from 2014 to 2018 and has been one of the two leaders of the SPD Hannover since 2020.

In the 2016 Lower Saxon local elections, Ahmetovic was elected to the District Council of Bothfeld-Vahrenheide.

Member of the German Parliament, 2021–present
In the 2021 German federal election, Ahmetovic won the constituency of Stadt Hannover I. In this capacity, he is his parliamentary group’s rapporteur on the Western Balkans.

Within his parliamentary group, Ahmetovic belongs to the Parliamentary Left, a left-wing movement.

Other activities
 Business Forum of the Social Democratic Party of Germany, Member of the Political Advisory Board (since 2022)

Political positions
Ahmetovic aims to invest more in education, better care and cheaper housing. He also wants to strengthen Hannover as a work location. He has said that he is "very loyal" to the state of Bosnia and Herzegovina, and would like to be "Germany's strong voice for Bosnia and Herzegovina" in the Bundestag. For example, he advocates a rapid accession of Bosnia and Herzegovina to the European Union.

References

External links

 
 Adis Ahmetovic at the Bundestag
 

Living people
1993 births
Politicians from Hanover
German people of Bosnia and Herzegovina descent
21st-century German politicians
Naturalized citizens of Germany
Members of the Bundestag for Lower Saxony
Members of the Bundestag 2021–2025
Members of the Bundestag for the Social Democratic Party of Germany
University of Hanover alumni